Wengernalp is a request stop railway station in the municipality of Lauterbrunnen in the Swiss canton of Bern. The station is on the Wengernalpbahn (WAB), whose trains operate from Lauterbrunnen to Kleine Scheidegg via Wengen. It takes its name from the alpine meadow of Wengernalp on which it is situated.

The station is served by the following passenger trains:

References

External links 
 

Railway stations in the canton of Bern